Royden Patrick Dyson  (born November 15, 1948), is an American politician.  He is a former Democratic member of the United States House of Representatives from Maryland.

Born in Great Mills, Maryland, Dyson attended private schools and graduated from Great Mills High School in 1966.  He attended the University of Maryland, College Park, and the University of Baltimore in 1968, 1969, and 1970.  He also served as a legislative assistant in the United States House of Representatives from 1973 to 1974.

Dyson was elected to the Maryland House of Delegates, serving from 1975 to 1980, and was a delegate in 1978 to the Democratic National Issues Conference.  Dyson ran for Congress in the Eastern Shore-based 1st District in 1976, losing to two-term Republican Robert Bauman.  However, he defeated Bauman in 1980 after Bauman suffered a sex scandal in the weeks prior to election day.  Dyson was reelected three more times without much difficulty.

In the 1988 election, Dyson was dogged by allegations of improper contributions from defense contractors.  His Republican opponent was Wayne Gilchrest, a high school teacher who had never run for office before.  Dyson barely held onto his seat, winning by only 460 votes.  In 1990, Gilchrest defeated Dyson 57% to 43% despite again being badly outspent by Dyson, who received substantial PAC contributions in all of his later campaigns.

In 1995, Dyson was elected to the Maryland Senate, representing District 29 (St. Mary's County and southern Calvert County).  As of 2014, he resided in Great Mills.

Notes

References

External links
 

Democratic Party members of the Maryland House of Delegates
Democratic Party Maryland state senators
University of Maryland, College Park alumni
University of Baltimore alumni
People from St. Mary's County, Maryland
Living people
1948 births
Democratic Party members of the United States House of Representatives from Maryland
21st-century American politicians